The 2012 Puerto Rico gubernatorial election was held on November 6, 2012, to elect the Governor of Puerto Rico.

The incumbent PNP Governor Luis Fortuño and Resident Commissioner Pedro Pierluisi ran for a second term during this election. Their major challengers were the PPD nominee and current Senator Alejandro García Padilla and his running mate, Rafael Cox Alomar. The election also featured four minor party candidates, being the second time in 40 years with six candidates for governor.

In the morning of November 7, 2012, Fortuño conceded the election to Alejandro García Padilla, just as the last votes were being counted. However, Pierluisi retained his position as Resident Commissioner by defeating Cox Alomar. With a margin of 0.6%, this election was the closest race of the 2012 gubernatorial election cycle.

Candidates

New Progressive Party
Incumbent Governor of Puerto Rico, Luis Fortuño, announced his candidacy for reelection in October 2011. Former Secretary of Health, Iván González Cancel, challenged him to a primary, but the court ruled it out.

Popular Democratic Party

Current senator Alejandro García Padilla, announced his candidacy in March 2011.

Puerto Rican Independence Party

Former Electoral Commissioner Juan Dalmau Ramírez, announced his candidacy for the Puerto Rican Independence Party. In January 2012, he presented his campaign staff and government program.

Puerto Ricans for Puerto Rico

Rogelio Figueroa is the candidate for governor for the PPR party.

Movimiento Unión Soberanista

The MUS had chosen Dr. Enrique Vázquez Quintana as candidate for governor. However, in August 2012, Vázquez Quintana withdrew from the candidacy. A week later, he was replaced by Attorney Arturo Hernández, who was formerly president of the Puerto Rico Bar Association. Hernández was already a candidate for the Senate of Puerto Rico.

Working People's Party

Professor Rafael Bernabe was announced as the gubernatorial candidate for the PPT in June 2012.

General election campaign 

The campaign of the main opposing party, the Popular Democratic Party (PPD), focused mostly on the problems of crime, unemployment, and high utility costs, attributing them to the failure of the incumbent Governor, Luis Fortuño, from the New Progressive Party (PNP). The PNP, on the other hand, focused mostly on the lack of experience of the PPD candidate, Alejandro García Padilla.

The minority parties have directed their campaign at the inability of the main two parties to administer the country. The Puerto Ricans for Puerto Rico Party (PPR) attacked the alleged classism and social inequality of the current government, while the Working People's Party of Puerto Rico (PPT) advocated for a government more attuned to the working class.

Debates 

There were two official debates celebrated with all gubernatorial candidates. The first one was held on September 11, 2012 under the title of "Vota o Quédate Calla'o" ("Vote or Keep your Mouth Shut"). It was transmitted by the television network of Sistema Universitario Ana G. Méndez. The second debate was held on October 25, 2012 under the title of "El Gran Debate". This debate was transmitted by Telemundo and had the best TV ratings for the night with 18.7 and a 27.3% share.

Election results

See also 
 Puerto Rican general election, 2008
 Puerto Rican general election, 2012

References 

Gubernatorial election
2012
Puerto Rico